North Plainfield is a borough in Somerset County, in the U.S. state of New Jersey. It is located within the Raritan Valley region. As of the 2020 United States census, the borough's population was 22,808, an increase of 872 (+4.0%) from the 2010 census count of 21,936, which in turn reflected an increase of 833 (+3.9%) from the 21,103 counted in the 2000 census.

North Plainfield Township was created from portions of Warren Township by an act of the New Jersey Legislature passed on April 2, 1872. The borough of North Plainfield became an independent municipality on June 9, 1885. The name derives from Plainfield, which derived its name from a local estate or from its scenic location.

In 1902, the New Jersey Legislature approved measures that would have allowed the borough to become part of Union County (a measure repealed in 1903) and to allow for a merger of North Plainfield with the City of Plainfield subject to the approval of a referendum by voters in both municipalities.

North Plainfield is home to the Washington Park Historic District, which was listed on the National Register of Historic Places in 1987.

Geography
According to the United States Census Bureau, North Plainfield borough had a total area of 2.82 square miles (7.31 km2), including 2.81 square miles (7.27 km2) of land and 0.01 square miles (0.03 km2) of water (0.46%).

The borough is bordered by the municipalities of Watchung to the north, Green Brook Township to the southwest, all in Somerset County; and to the south by Plainfield  in Union County.

North Plainfield is in the northern division of the Raritan Valley along with Green Brook.

Demographics

2010 census

The Census Bureau's 2006–2010 American Community Survey showed that (in 2010 inflation-adjusted dollars) median household income was $67,815 (with a margin of error of +/− $2,878) and the median family income was $70,359 (+/− $5,666). Males had a median income of $42,766 (+/− $2,549) versus $43,057 (+/− $3,208) for females. The per capita income for the borough was $27,529 (+/− $1,466). About 5.3% of families and 7.3% of the population were below the poverty line, including 11.8% of those under age 18 and 6.7% of those age 65 or over.

2000 census
As of the 2000 United States census there were 21,103 people, 7,202 households, and 5,084 families residing in the borough. The population density was 7,565.0 people per square mile (2,920.4/km2). There were 7,393 housing units at an average density of 2,650.2 per square mile (1,023.1/km2). The racial makeup of the borough was 63.06% White, 13.38% African American, 0.28% Native American, 5.04% Asian, 0.08% Pacific Islander, 13.68% from other races, and 4.48% from two or more races. Hispanic or Latino of any race were 32.77% of the population.

There were 7,202 households, out of which 37.0% had children under the age of 18 living with them, 52.7% were married couples living together, 11.8% had a female householder with no husband present, and 29.4% were non-families. 23.2% of all households were made up of individuals, and 7.0% had someone living alone who was 65 years of age or older. The average household size was 2.90 and the average family size was 3.40.

In the borough the population was spread out, with 25.8% under the age of 18, 8.7% from 18 to 24, 36.5% from 25 to 44, 19.6% from 45 to 64, and 9.5% who were 65 years of age or older. The median age was 34 years. For every 100 females there were 97.3 males. For every 100 females age 18 and over, there were 96.8 males.

The median income for a household in the borough was $55,322, and the median income for a family was $62,875. Males had a median income of $39,662 versus $30,816 for females. The per capita income for the borough was $22,791. About 4.4% of families and 6.4% of the population were below the poverty line, including 6.5% of those under age 18 and 10.4% of those age 65 or over.

As of the 2000 Census, 5.39% of North Plainfield's residents identified themselves as being of Ecuadorian ancestry, which was the fourth highest of any municipality in New Jersey and the eighth highest percentage of Ecuadorian people in any place in the United States with 1,000 or more residents identifying their ancestry.

Government

Local government
The Borough of North Plainfield is governed within the Faulkner Act under the Mayor-Council system of municipal government (Plan E), implemented as of January 1, 1977, based on the recommendations of a Charter Study Commission. The borough is one of 71 municipalities (of the 564) statewide governed under this form. The governing body is comprised of the Mayor and the Township Council. This form provides for a strong-mayor type of government, in which the mayor has executive functions and the legislative branch is the Borough Council. The Councilmembers and Mayor are elected in even-numbered years at the November general election to staggered four-year terms of office in partisan elections on an at-large basis, with four council seats up for election together and then the mayor and the other three council seats up for election at the same time, two years later. The Municipal Judge is appointed by the Mayor with the advice and consent of the Council, and serves for three years. The Mayor runs the Borough on a day-to-day basis and ensures the enforcement of the legislation passed by the Council.

, the Mayor of North Plainfield is Democrat Lawrence J. La Ronde, whose term of office ends December 31, 2024. Members of the North Plainfield Borough Council are Council President Frank A. "Skip" Stabile III (D, 2024), Council Vice President Everett Merrill (D, 2022), Aimee Corzo (D, 2024), Suezette Given (D, 2022; elected to serve an unexpired term), Steve McIntyre (D, 2022; elected to serve an unexpired term), Keiona R. Miller (D, 2024) and Wendy Schaefer (D, 2022).

In January 2021, the Borough Council selected Steve McIntyre from a list of three candidate submitted by the Democratic municipal committee to fill the vacant council seat expiring in December 2022 that had been held by Lawrence La Ronde who stepped down from the council to take office as mayor. Later that month, the Borough Council selected Suezette Given from a list of three submitted individuals to fill the seat expiring in December 2022 that had been held by Douglass M. Singleterry until he resigned from office on the last day of December to take office on the Somerset County Board of County Commissioners. McIntyre and Given served on an interim basis until the November 2021 general election, when they were both elected to serve the balance of the terms of office.

In August 2018, the Borough Council selected Aimee Corzo from a list of three candidates nominated by the Democratic municipal committee to fill the seat expiring in December 2020 that had been held by Frank Righetti until he resigned from office. Corzo served on an interim basis until the November 2018 general election, when she was elected to serve the balance of the term of office.

Federal, state, and county representation
North Plainfield is located in the 12th Congressional District and is part of New Jersey's 22nd state legislative district.

 

Somerset County is governed by a five-member Board of County Commissioners, whose members are elected at-large to three-year terms of office on a staggered basis, with one or two seats coming up for election each year. At an annual reorganization meeting held on the first Friday of January, the board selects a Director and Deputy Director from among its members. , Somerset County's County Commissioners are
Director Shanel Robinson (D, Franklin Township, term as commissioner ends December 31, 2024; term as director ends 2022),
Deputy Director Melonie Marano (D, Green Brook Township, term as commissioner and as deputy director ends 2022),
Paul Drake (D, Hillsborough Township, 2023),
Douglas Singleterry (D, North Plainfield, 2023) and 
Sara Sooy (D, Basking Ridge in Bernards Township, 2024).
Pursuant to Article VII Section II of the New Jersey State Constitution, each county in New Jersey is required to have three elected administrative officials known as constitutional officers. These officers are the County Clerk and County Surrogate (both elected for five-year terms of office) and the County Sheriff (elected for a three-year term). Constitutional officers, elected on a countywide basis are 
County Clerk Steve Peter (D, Somerville, 2022),
Sheriff Darrin Russo (D, Franklin Township, 2022) and 
Surrogate Bernice "Tina" Jalloh (D, Franklin Township, 2025)

Politics
As of March 2011, there were a total of 9,738 registered voters in North Plainfield, of which 3,403 (34.9% vs. 26.0% countywide) were registered as Democrats, 1,582 (16.2% vs. 25.7%) were registered as Republicans and 4,746 (48.7% vs. 48.2%) were registered as Unaffiliated. There were 7 voters registered as Libertarians or Greens. Among the borough's 2010 Census population, 44.4% (vs. 60.4% in Somerset County) were registered to vote, including 58.8% of those ages 18 and over (vs. 80.4% countywide).

In the 2012 presidential election, Democrat Barack Obama received 72.9% of the vote (4,655 cast), ahead of Republican Mitt Romney with 26.2% (1,671 votes), and other candidates with 1.0% (61 votes), among the 6,432 ballots cast by the borough's 10,444 registered voters (45 ballots were spoiled), for a turnout of 61.6%. In the 2008 presidential election, Democrat Barack Obama received 4,938 votes (67.5% vs. 52.1% countywide), ahead of Republican John McCain with 2,219 votes (30.3% vs. 46.1%) and other candidates with 84 votes (1.1% vs. 1.1%), among the 7,317 ballots cast by the borough's 9,825 registered voters, for a turnout of 74.5% (vs. 78.7% in Somerset County). In the 2004 presidential election, Democrat John Kerry received 3,861 votes (58.5% vs. 47.2% countywide), ahead of Republican George W. Bush with 2,650 votes (40.2% vs. 51.5%) and other candidates with 60 votes (0.9% vs. 0.9%), among the 6,597 ballots cast by the borough's 8,891 registered voters, for a turnout of 74.2% (vs. 81.7% in the whole county).

In the 2013 gubernatorial election, Democrat Barbara Buono received 49.5% of the vote (1,681 cast), ahead of Republican Chris Christie with 48.8% (1,658 votes), and other candidates with 1.7% (59 votes), among the 3,453 ballots cast by the borough's 10,602 registered voters (55 ballots were spoiled), for a turnout of 32.6%. In the 2009 gubernatorial election, Democrat Jon Corzine received 2,119 ballots cast (50.3% vs. 34.1% countywide), ahead of Republican Chris Christie with 1,744 votes (41.4% vs. 55.8%), Independent Chris Daggett with 255 votes (6.1% vs. 8.7%) and other candidates with 46 votes (1.1% vs. 0.7%), among the 4,214 ballots cast by the borough's 9,840 registered voters, yielding a 42.8% turnout (vs. 52.5% in the county).

Education
The North Plainfield School District, serves public school students from pre-kindergarten through twelfth grade. As of the 2018–19 school year, the district, comprised of six schools, had an enrollment of 3,342 students and 304.0 classroom teachers (on an FTE basis), for a student–teacher ratio of 11.0:1. Schools in the district (with 2018–19 enrollment data from the National Center for Education Statistics) are 
East End Elementary School (423 students; in grades Pre-K–4), 
Stony Brook Elementary School (253; Pre-K–4), 
West End Elementary School (488; K–4), 
Somerset Intermediate School (516; 5–6), 
North Plainfield Middle School (544; 7–8) and 
North Plainfield High School (1,052; 9–12).

Transportation

Roads and highways

Major roadways in the borough include U.S. Route 22. County Route 531 also passes through.

Public transportation
NJ Transit rail service is available at the Plainfield station on the Raritan Valley Line to Newark Penn Station, with connecting service to Hoboken Terminal and Penn Station New York.

NJ Transit bus service to and from the Port Authority Bus Terminal in Midtown Manhattan is available on the 114 and 117 routes, to Newark on the 65 and 66 routes, with local service on the 822 and 986 routes.

Starting in May 2017, Community Access Transit began operating the 2R bus from North Plainfield to Raritan Valley Community College, with stops in the communities of Somerville and Raritan.

Notable people

People who were born in, residents of, or otherwise closely associated with North Plainfield include:

 Alex Abrahantes (born 1977), professional wrestler, manager and on-air television personality
 Hank Beenders (1916–2003), one of the first foreign-born players in what is now the NBA
 Jack Bicknell (born 1938), retired American football coach at the college level and in the various incarnations of NFL Europe
 Jack Bicknell Jr. (born 1963), football coach who had been an assistant offensive line coach with the New York Giants
 Kay Blumetta (1923–1997), pitcher who played in the All-American Girls Professional Baseball League
 Dan Canter (born 1961), soccer defender who played three seasons in the North American Soccer League and three in Major Indoor Soccer League, in addition to playing with the United States men's national soccer team
 Pete Carmichael (born 1941), former football coach
 Anne Casale (1930–2002), cookbook author, raised in North Plainfield
 Allan Crite (1910–2007), artist
 John DiMaggio (born 1968), actor who has performed the voice of Bender on Futurama
 Bill Evans (1929–1980), jazz musician
 Allen Gavilanes (born 1999), soccer player who plays for Greenville Triumph SC in USL League One
 David T. Kenney (1866–1922), vacuum cleaner inventor and manufacturer
 Anthony Krizan, lead guitarist for the Spin Doctors
 Richard Larson (born 1943), operations researcher and educator, who has been a faculty member at the Massachusetts Institute of Technology
 Harry Leahey (1935–1990), jazz guitarist and teacher
 Jack Melick (born 1929), bandleader, pianist and arranger
 Barry Miles (born 1947), pianist, drummer, composer and producer
 Dorian Missick (born ), actor, known for his role as Damian in the television series Six Degrees and for voicing Victor Vance in the video game Grand Theft Auto: Vice City Stories
 Molly Price (born 1966), actress
 Jorge Rodriguez-Gerada (born 1966), Cuban-born contemporary artist
 Steve Schmidt (born 1970), senior campaign strategist to the 2008 presidential campaign of Senator John McCain
 John R. Winckler (1916–2001), physicist best known for his discovery of sprites, a variety of lightning found in the upper atmosphere

References

External links

 North Plainfield official web site
 North Plainfield Public Schools
 
 School Data for the North Plainfield Public Schools, National Center for Education Statistics
  North Plainfield Citizens for Community Rights – Community Blog
 North Plainfield Rescue Squad
The Alternative Press of North Plainfield and Green Brook

 
1885 establishments in New Jersey
Boroughs in Somerset County, New Jersey
Faulkner Act (mayor–council)
Populated places established in 1885